Indian Creek is a river in Otsego County, New York. It converges with Sand Hill Creek west-northwest of Wells Bridge.

References

Rivers of New York (state)
Rivers of Otsego County, New York